Ramoncita was launched at Shields in 1809. She was captured and recaptured in 1812, an event that gave rise to a case in insurance law and salvage. Then in 1813 she participated in a single ship action in which, despite heavy casualties, she was able to repel the attack of a US privateer. She capsized later in 1813 and was subsequently condemned.

Career
Ramoncita first appeared in Lloyd's Register (LR) in 1809.

As Ramoncita was returning from Lima and Cadiz, the French privateer Amelia captured her. However, the gun-brig  recaptured Ramoncita and brought her into Cork. The recapture had taken place on 12 March 1812. (All four of the vessels in company with Virago were 74-gun third rate ships of the line.) 

Charterers had chartered Ramoncita at a rate of £2 10s per register ton for a round trip. She was to take a cargo to Lima. She did so, and there took on a new cargo for Cadiz and London. She delivered part of her cargo to Cadiz, and was on her way to London when she was captured and recaptured. The situation gave rise to a decision on the law of salvage and was still relevant in 1894.

On 2 January 1813, Ramoncita, Venables, master, arrived at Demerara. On her way from London she was off Madeira when she had encountered a United States privateer, Alexander, of Salem. Alexander was armed with 16 guns and had a crew of 150 men. An engagement of four-and-a half hours ensued, much of it with the vessels at half-pistol shot (about 25 yards), apart. When Alexander finally sheared off, Ramoncita raked her. Ramoncitas casualties amounted to five men killed and 12 wounded.

One of the passengers aboard Ramoncita was Lieutenant Playter of the Royal Militia. At the commencement of the action he took charge of the men acting as marines. Playter so distinguished himself that when Ramoncita arrived at Demerara, the governor, General Carmichael, Lieutenant Governor of Demerara Essequibo, immediately promoted Playter to the rank of Captain.

Fate
On 28 June 1813, Ramoncita capsized in the Demerara River. She was declared a total loss and condemned.

Notes

Citations

References
 
 
 
 

1809 ships
Ships built on the River Tyne
Age of Sail merchant ships of England
Captured ships
Maritime incidents in 1813